The Church of All Saints in East Pennard, Somerset, England, dates from the 14th century. It is a grade I listed building.

The tower contains a clock and five bells. They are the second heaviest peal of five bells in the world.

Inside the church is a Norman font and several stained-glass windows, also an altar screen and monuments of the Martines and Napiers.

The 15th-century churchyard cross was restored in 1919 as a memorial to those who died in World War I.

In 2011 fundraising was undertaken to raise the £60,000 needed to repair the roof.

The parish is part of the Fosse Trinity benefice within the deanery of Shepton Mallet.

See also
 Grade I listed buildings in Mendip
 List of Somerset towers
 List of ecclesiastical parishes in the Diocese of Bath and Wells

References

External links
East Pennard Church website

14th-century church buildings in England
Grade I listed churches in Somerset
Church of England church buildings in Mendip District
Grade I listed buildings in Mendip District